Bienvenidos is a live album by Argentine alternative rock band Cabezones.

Track listing 
 "Alud" – 3:38 
 "Bienvenidos" – 4:00 
 "Lejos es no estar" – 4:48
 "Hombre paranoico" – 2:54 
 "Sueles dejarme solo" – 3:26
 "Vertiente" – 3:18
 "Inmóvil" – 3:27
 "Pasajero en extinción" – 5:12 
 "Irte" – 4:32
 "Mi pequeña infinidad" – 3:45
 "Globo" – 5:18
 "Abismo" – 3:42
 "Cada secreto" – 3:37
 "Mírame" – 3:12
 "Frágil" – 3:38 
 "Despegar" – 3:01
 "Buenas noches" – 6:01 
 "Frío" – 5:21
 "Ojos en mi espalda " – 3:56

Personnel 
Gustavo Martinez – bass guitar
Alejandro Collados – drums
Esteban Serniotti – electric guitar and backing vocals
César Andino – lead vocals
Leandro Aput – guitar

Cabezones albums
2006 live albums